Simón Bolívar is an underground metro station on the Line 4 of the Santiago Metro, in Santiago, Chile. It is named for the nearby Simón Bolívar Avenue, which in turn is named after Simón Bolívar. The station was opened on 30 November 2005 as part of the inaugural section of the line between Tobalaba and Grecia.

References

Santiago Metro stations